Robert "Bobby" Shuttleworth (born May 13, 1987) is an American former professional soccer player who played as a goalkeeper for multiple teams in MLS and USL Championship.

Early life
Shuttleworth grew up in Buffalo, New York, and while attending Nichols School he set the school record with 48 career shutouts. Among his other accolades were winning 2 New York State Private High School Championships as well as earning first-team All-Western New York, All-State and All-East region honors. He finished his high school career with a 20–2–1 record in his senior year.

Career

College
Shuttleworth initially attended and played college soccer at Loyola College in Baltimore. Eventually, he transferred to the University at Buffalo where he played soccer with the Bulls. He finished with a 0.94 goals against average and an 8–2–2 record.

During his college years he also played with Kalamazoo Outrage in the USL Premier Development League where he helped the Stu Riddle-led franchise to the elite 8 before succumbing to the eventual 2008 PDL champions Thunder Bay Chill.

Shuttleworth has also coached in an assistant coach role at Bentley University.

Professional
Shuttleworth played briefly with Buffalo City in the National Premier Soccer League before being signed as a free agent on June 18, 2009 by New England Revolution after the Revs played against USL First Division team Austin Aztex in a pre-season match, with whom Shuttleworth was on trial. He signed one-year deal with an option for another four years and later spent a short time on loan with Western Mass Pioneers in the USL Second Division.

He made his debut for the Revolution in a 3–0 loss against the New York Red Bulls in U.S. Open Cup qualifying on May 12, 2010. He made his first appearance in MLS league play on May 29 vs New York Red Bulls, coming on as a substitute after a serious injury to Preston Burpo. Shuttleworth earned his first MLS Regular Season clean sheet on October 16 in a 1–0 win against visiting Kansas City.

On February 15, 2017, Shuttleworth was traded to Minnesota United in exchange for Femi Hollinger-Janzen. Shuttleworth came on late in United's home opener after an injury to starter John Alvbåge, and went on to start the team's next three games. He tended goal for Minnesota United's first MLS point, a 2–2 draw against the Colorado Rapids, and first MLS win, a 4–2 victory over Real Salt Lake.

On August 6, 2019, Shuttleworth was loaned to USL Championship side Sacramento Republic for the remainder of the season.

Following his release by Minnesota at the end of the 2019 season, Shuttleworth joined Chicago Fire on January 30, 2020. Following the 2021 season, Shuttleworth's contract with Chicago expired.

On January 14, 2022, Shuttleworth joined Atlanta United on a one year contract with a club option in 2023.

On July 7, 2022, Shuttleworth announced his retirement from professional soccer.

Beginning with the 2022 season, Shuttleworth is serving as an assistant coach with the Florida State University women’s soccer team.

Career statistics

Club

References

External links
 
 

1987 births
Living people
American soccer players
Loyola Greyhounds men's soccer players
Buffalo Bulls men's soccer players
Albany BWP Highlanders players
Kalamazoo Outrage players
New England Revolution players
Western Mass Pioneers players
Minnesota United FC players
Sacramento Republic FC players
Chicago Fire FC players
Atlanta United FC players
Association football goalkeepers
Soccer players from New York (state)
USL League Two players
USL Second Division players
Major League Soccer players
USL Championship players
Sportspeople from Erie County, New York
People from Tonawanda, New York